Refresh My Heart is the debut album from then-teenage Christian pop rock artist Rebecca St. James. It was released under the name Rebecca Jean by DTS Music and distributed by Word Australia sometime within the first six months, and 25 days of 1991 when St. James was 13 years old. It was later re-released without an associated label. According to her Facebook page, this album comprised all Hillsong songs.

Track listing

References

1991 debut albums
Rebecca St. James albums